Gary Parrish is a sports columnist for CBSSports.com, a host, studio analyst and sideline reporter for the CBS Sports Network, the host of the CBS Sports Eye On College Basketball podcast, and the host of "The Gary Parrish Show" on Grind City Media in Memphis.

Parrish has been with CBS Sports since 2006 and Grind City Media since 2023.

He previously worked at The Commercial Appeal and 92.9 FM ESPN in Memphis.

References

Living people
Year of birth missing (living people)
People from DeSoto County, Mississippi
People from Memphis, Tennessee
American sportswriters